Small nucleolar RNA host gene 6 is a Long non-coding RNA that in humans is encoded by the SNHG6 gene.

References

Further reading